The Verbandsliga Schleswig-Holstein-Süd is the seventh tier of the German football league system and the third-highest league in the German state of Schleswig-Holstein, together with five other leagues at this level in the state.  The league was formed at the end of the 2007–08 season, to replace the previously existing Bezirksoberligas at this level.

Overview
With the changes to the German football league system in 2008 that went alongside the introduction of the 3. Liga, four new Verbandsligas were formed in Schleswig-Holstein as the sixth tier of the league system, these being:
 Verbandsliga Schleswig-Holstein-Ost (as Süd-Ost)
 Verbandsliga Schleswig-Holstein-West (as Süd-West)
 Verbandsliga Schleswig-Holstein-Nord (as Nord-West)
 Verbandsliga Schleswig-Holstein-Ost (as Nord-Ost)

Previous to that, from 1978 to 2008, a single-division Verbandsliga Schleswig-Holstein existed which was now renamed Oberliga Schleswig-Holstein and received the status of an Oberliga.

These four new Verbandsligas replaced the previously existing four Bezirksoberligas (BOL), who were, until then, divided into northern, southern, eastern and western divisions. The Bezirksoberligas themselves were formed in 1999. Other changes in the league system were the abolishment of the four Bezirksoberligas and the five Bezirksligas below them. Additionally, the regional alignment of the four new Verbandsligas differed from the Bezirksoberligas they replaced, making the change from one to the other more than just a renaming of leagues.

The new Verbandsliga Schleswig-Holstein-Süd was formed from five clubs of the Verbandsliga Schleswig-Holstein (V), ten clubs from the former Bezirksoberliga Schleswig-Holstein-Süd (VI) and two clubs from the Bezirksliga Schleswig-Holstein-Süd (VII), one from the northern division and one from the southern division.

The league champions of each of the six Verbandsligas will earn promotion to the Landesliga Schleswig-Holstein. Below the six Verbandsligas, eleven regional Kreisligas are placed. The  bottom teams in the Verbandsligas will be relegated to  the Kreisligas while the champions of those will earn promotion to the Verbandsligas. The Verbandsliga Süd covers the following three Kreise:
 Herzogtum Lauenburg
 Lübeck
 Stormarn

From the 2017–18 season onwards, the Verbandsligas were contracted to 16 teams each and downgraded to seventh tier with the introduction of the new Landesliga Schleswig-Holstein (VI). For the 2020–21 season, however, relegation was suspended after the previous one and the league temporarily contracted to 12 teams, losing eight from 2019–20 to the recreated Süd-Ost division.

League champions

In 2019 Breitenfelder SV was also promoted as runner-up.
 In 2020 the season was abandoned due to the coronavirus pandemic in Germany and table placings were determined by points per game averages. Sereetzer SV was also promoted as runner-up.

Founding members
The league was formed from 18 clubs, which had played in the following leagues in 2007-08: 
 From the Verbandsliga Schleswig-Holstein:
 Breitenfelder SV, 15th
 FC Dornbreite Lübeck, 16th
 SV Eichede, 17th
 TSV Bargteheide, 18th
 Spvg Rot Weiß Moisling, 19th
 From the Bezirksoberliga Schleswig-Holstein-Süd:
 GW Siebenbäumen, 2nd
 Moellner SV, 3rd
 VfL Oldesloe, 4th
 Sereetzer SV, 5th
 SV Preußen 09 Reinfeld, 7th
 Oldenburger SV, 8th
 ATSV Stockelsdorf, 9th
 Eintracht Groß Grönau, 11th
 TSV Gudow, 12th
 TSV Pansdorf, 13th
 From the Bezirksliga Schleswig-Holstein-Süd (Nord):
 SpVgg Eutin 08, 1st
 TSV Lensahn, 2nd
 From the Bezirksliga Schleswig-Holstein-Süd (Süd):
 AKM Lübeck, 1st

References

Sources
 Deutschlands Fußball in Zahlen,  An annual publication with tables and results from the Bundesliga to Verbandsliga/Landesliga. DSFS.
 Kicker Almanach,  The yearbook on German football from Bundesliga to Oberliga, since 1937. Kicker Sports Magazine.
 Die Deutsche Liga-Chronik 1945-2005  History of German football from 1945 to 2005 in tables. DSFS. 2006.

External links 
 Das deutsche Fussball Archiv  Historic German league tables
 The Schleswig-Holstein Football Association (SHFV) 

Schleswig
Football competitions in Schleswig-Holstein
2008 establishments in Germany
Sports leagues established in 2008

de:Verbandsliga Schleswig-Holstein (ab 2008)